Gobindpur  is a village in the Gobindpur CD block in the Seraikela Sadar subdivision of the Seraikela Kharsawan district in the Indian state of Jharkhand.

Geography

Location
Gobindpur is located at

Area overview
The area shown in the map has been described as “part of the southern fringe of the Chotanagpur plateau and is a hilly upland tract”. 75.7% of the population lives in the rural areas and 24.3% lives in the urban areas.

Note: The map alongside presents some of the notable locations in the district. All places marked in the map are linked in the larger full screen map.

Demographics
According to the 2011 Census of India, Gobindpur had a total population of 1,577, of which 802 (51%) were males and 775 (49%) were females. Population in the age range 0–6 years was 245. The total number of literate persons in Gobindpur was 844 (63.36% of the population over 6 years).

(*For language details see Gobindpur block#Language and religion)

Transport
National Highway 220 passes through Gobindpur.

Education
Rajkiya Middle School Govindpur is a Hindi-medium coeducational institution established in 1934. It has facilities for teaching from class I to class VIII.

Healthcare
There is a primary health centre at Gobindpur.

References

Villages in Seraikela Kharsawan district